Adjohoun or Adjohon is a town, arrondissement, and commune in Ouémé Department, Benin. The commune is divided into 8 arrondissements and 57 villages.
The commune of Adjohoun is located approximately 32 km from Porto-Novo and 62 km from Cotonou. The commune covers an area of 308 km2 and as of 2002 had a population of 60,955, 48.14% male and 51.86% female. The commune covers an area of 112 square kilometres and as of 2002 had a population of 60,112 people.

Geography
Adjohoun is located in the Ouémé River valley. It is a fertile area in which agricultural pastures dominate.

Administration
The commune is divided into 8 arrondissements. These are Adjohoun, Awonou, Azowlissé, Dèmè, Gangban, Kogé and Togbota. The City Council is composed of 15 advisers who elect the mayor, who is currently Leon Bokova. A former mayor is Gerard Adounsiba. The District Council is composed of 13 advisers who elect the Chief District.

Economy
Crops grown include maize, rice, potatoes, sesame, tomatoes, oranges and bananas. Fishing is also one of the main industries.

References

External links
Official site

Communes of Benin
Arrondissements of Benin
Populated places in the Ouémé Department